Patrick J. Harkins (born December 22, 1963) is an American politician serving as a Democratic member of the Pennsylvania House of Representatives for 1st District and was elected in 2006.

Early life and education
Harkins grew up in Erie, Pennsylvania. The youngest of five children to Bernard (Babe) and Rita Harkins. He graduated from Erie Tech Memorial High School. While in high school he earned an electrical-electronics certification. At Mercyhurst College, he studied political science and business. After a year at Mercyhurst he transferred to Penn State Behrend where he studied political science and business. He worked as a driver for UPS for 25 years. While employed there he also became active in the local Teamsters Union, Teamsters LU 397.

Career
Harkins was first elected in 2006.  The district opened up when Rep. Linda Bebko-Jones retired following a challenge to the validity of her petition signatures.  He won a three-way primary election over Democrats Michael Skrzypczak and Dennis Iaquinta and went on to defeat Republican Christine Pontoriero with 75% of the vote.

In the primary of 2016 Harkins faced no opposition, in the general election on November 8. 2016 Harkins won reelection to his sixth term defeating William Edward Crotty by 76% to 22%. Harkins was sworn in for his sixth term on January 3, 2017.

Committee assignments 

 Gaming Oversight
 Professional Licensure
 Rules

Personal life
Harkins served as a board member on the Sacred Heart School Board for six years, and served as board president for three of those six years. Harkins and his wife Michelle founded the Reservoir Dogs neighborhood crime watch organization in their neighborhood. He also served as judge of elections in Erie County, Pennsylvania.

References

External links
Pennsylvania House Democratic Caucus – Pat Harkins - official caucus website
 Pennsylvania House of Representatives – Pat Harkins - official PA House website

Follow the Money – Pat Harkins' 2006 campaign contributions

1963 births
Living people
Democratic Party members of the Pennsylvania House of Representatives
Politicians from Erie, Pennsylvania
Pennsylvania State University alumni
21st-century American politicians

Mercyhurst University alumni